The Trẹm River is a river of Vietnam. It flows through Cà Mau Province and Kiên Giang Province for 36 kilometres and is a tributary of the Ông Đốc River.

References

Rivers of Kiên Giang province
Rivers of Cà Mau province
Rivers of Vietnam